Oenothera coronopifolia, the crownleaf evening primrose, is a plant species. The Zuni people apply a poultice of the powdered flower and saliva night to swellings.

References

coronopifolia
Flora of the Southwestern United States
Plants used in traditional Native American medicine
Plants described in 1840